Elena Angélica Dolores Holmberg Lanusse (24 May 1931 – disappeared 20 December 1978), better known as Elena Holmberg, was an Argentine diplomat who was kidnapped and assassinated in 1978. Distinguished for being the first woman to graduate from the Institute of Foreign Services of the Nation, Holmberg was an important official of the military dictatorship which took power in 1976, and is generally believed to have been detained-disappeared and then killed by the regime to which she belonged.

Biography
Elena Holmberg came from a traditional family, the sister of retired Colonel Enrique Holmberg and cousin of General Alejandro Lanusse (former de facto president of the Argentine Republic). She worked as a career functionary at the Argentine Embassy in France.

People released from the Higher School of Mechanics of the Navy (ESMA) declared that at that time certain officers of the detention center alluded to their participation in the disappearance of Elena Holmberg.

On 11 January 1979, her decomposed body was found in the Luján River in Tigre, Buenos Aires Province. It was later identified by her cousin Lanusse.

Holmberg's family and journalist Andrea Basconi have asserted they believe that Admiral Emilio Massera was the one who directly ordered her death, believing that she possessed compromising information about his contact with members of the Montoneros.

See also
List of kidnappings
List of solved missing person cases

References

1931 births
1978 deaths
Argentine women diplomats
Assassinated diplomats
Female murder victims
Enforced disappearances in Argentina
Formerly missing people
Kidnapped diplomats
Missing person cases in Argentina